Dağlı (literally "mountainous") may refer to:
Dağlı, Erdemli, a village in Mersin Province, Turkey
 Dağlı, Quba, a village in Quba Rayon of Azerbaijan
 Dağlı, Zaqatala, formerly Əli Bayramlı, Azerbaijan

Surname
Vadilal Dagli, Gujarati poet & essayist
Tamer Dağlı, Turkish politician

Muhammad Emin Dağlı, Turkish-Canadian Businessman

See also
Dağlı Castle